Chema or Phema
(),
is a village in the Chumbi Valley or Yadong County in the Tibet region of China. It is in the valley of Amo Chu  where the route from Sikkim's Nathu La pass meets the Amo Chu valley. Chema is in the Xiayadong Township.

Across the river, on its eastern bank is the settlement of Pipitang
(), which was described as a flourishing Chinese village in the 19th century. The village got emptied during the period of Tibet's independence (1912–1951). It is now repopulated.

Geography 
Chema and Pipitang are four miles to the south of Yatung (Shasima). The track from the Nathu La pass met the Amo Chu valley here, while the track from the Jelep La pass also joined here via Rinchengang. At the present time, the Yanai Road runs along this route to Nathu La.

In December 1903, British travel writer Laurence Waddell passed through Chema on his way to Lhasa and described it as follows:

His description continued with that of Pipitang:

During the period 1894–1903, when a British Indian trade mart was opened at Old Yatung near Rinchengang, all the villages in the Chumbi valley were involved with the India–Tibet trade. Pipithang also had many Chinese officials and a yamen for handling passports and foreign visitors. Ekai Kawaguchi describes the elaborate procedures devised by the Tibetan and Chinese administration for traders visiting India. The senior Chinese official of the yamen was called Popon.

During 1904–1908, when the Chumbi Valley came under the administration of the British per the Convention of Lhasa, the Chinese continued to use Pipithang as their base, and attempted to act as if they were still controlling the Chumbi Valley. After 1911 Xinhai Revolution and the Dalai Lama's declaration of independence, all Chinese nationals were forced to leave Tibet. The village of Pipitang was deserted and said to have been in ruins in 1919. A British report in 1940 said that the all the houses except one were washed away in a flood.

Current status

Notes

References

Bibliography 
 
 
 
 
 
 
 
 
 

Populated places in Shigatse
Yadong County